Ja'far Pasha al-Askari (15 September 1885 – 29 October 1936) served twice as prime minister of Iraq: from 22 November 1923 to 3 August 1924; and from 21 November 1926 to 31 December 1927.

Al-Askari served in the Ottoman Army during World War I until he was captured by British forces attacking the Empire from Egypt. After he was released he was converted to the cause of Arab nationalism and joined forces with Amir Faisal and T. E. Lawrence (Lawrence of Arabia), with his brother-in-law, Nuri as-Said, who would also serve as prime minister of Iraq. Al-Askari took part in the conquest of Damascus in 1918 and supported placing Faisal on the Syrian throne. When Faisal was deposed by the French in 1920, he advocated granting him a new throne in Iraq.

As a reward for his loyalty, Faisal granted Al-Askari several important cabinet positions, including minister of defense in the first Iraqi government. He served as prime minister twice, and was also minister of foreign affairs. Al-Askari was minister of defense in Yasin al-Hashimi's government when it was overthrown by Chief of Staff Bakr Sidqi in 1936, in Iraq's first coup. Al-Askari was assassinated during the coup.

Early life and Ottoman Army career
Ja’far Pasha al-Askari was born on September 15, 1885, in Kirkuk, when it was still part of the Ottoman Empire. The fourth of five brothers and one sister, his family were of Kurdish origin. His father, Mustafa Abdul Rahman Al-Mudarris, was a colonel in the Ottoman Army. Ja’far attended the Military College in Baghdad before transferring to the Military College in the Ottoman capital of Constantinople, where he graduated in 1904 as a second lieutenant. He was then sent to the Sixth Army stationed in Baghdad. Ja’far then was sent to Berlin, Germany from 1910 to 1912 to train and study as part of an Ottoman initiative to reform the army through the selection of officers via competition. Al-Askari stayed in this program until ordered back to the Ottoman Empire to fight in the war between the Ottoman Empire and the Balkan States.

After the war with the Balkan states ended in 1913, Ja’far was made an instructor at the Officer Training College in Aleppo, but eight months later passed qualifications for the Staff Officers’ College in Constantinople.

World War I and the Arab Rebellion
When World War I broke out, Ja’far first fought on the side of the Ottomans and the Triple Alliance in Libya. His campaign started in Dardanelles, after which he received the German Iron Cross and was promoted to general. After his promotion he was sent to command the Senoussi Army in Libya. At the Battle of Agagia Ja’far was captured by the British led forces and incarcerated in a citadel in Cairo with his friend and later brother-in-law Nuri as-Said. Ja’far made one escape attempt by fashioning a rope out of blankets to scale the citadel walls. During this attempt, the blanket broke and Ja’far fell, breaking his ankle leading to his being captured by the guards. According to his obituary, Ja’far offered to pay for the blanket as he was on friendly terms with his captors.

Some time after his escape attempt (either while recovering or on parole), Ja’far learned about the nationalist Arab Revolt against the Ottomans led by the Hashemite leader of the Hijaz, Hussein bin Ali, the Sharif of Mecca. This revolt had been sponsored by the British forces and the Triple Entente so as to open up an extra front inside the Ottoman Empire in order to bleed them from internal rebellion. In exchange, the British had promised to create an Arab country led by Husayn. This promise is embodied in the Husayn-McMahon Correspondence. Upon reading about the Arab Revolt and due to an increasing hostile Ottoman approach to Arab affairs (his friend Salim Al-Jazairi was executed along with other prominent Arabs for nationalist activities by another Ottoman general, Jamal Pasha), Ja’far decided that this was precisely in line with beliefs he had and decided to switch sides from the Ottomans to the Hashemite Revolt forces along with his friend Nuri as-Said. At first Sharif Husayn was hesitant to let Ja’far, a former general in the Ottoman army, join his forces, but eventually relented and Ja’far was invited by Husayn's son, Amir Faisal, to join in the fight against the Ottoman Empire. Ja’far fought under Amir Faisal throughout this period up until the fall of the Ottoman Empire, including Faisal's assault on Damascus in 1918.

Governor of Aleppo and Iraqi Nationalism
After World War I and the collapse of the Ottoman Empire, another of Husayn's sons, Amir Zaid, on behalf of Amir Faisal, asked Ja’far to be the Inspector General of the Army of the newly established Arab state of Syria, which he accepted. Shortly thereafter, Ja’far was appointed the military Governor of the Aleppo Vilayet in Syria. During his time as governor in Syria, Ja’far listened to many Iraqis about the status of their homeland and British rule. Ja’far advocated the idea that Iraqis could take charge of Iraq themselves and would do better than the British officials currently controlling the territory. Al-Askari was in favor of a Hashemite ruler with ties to Britain taking over Iraq; he joined his friend Nuri al-Sa’id in being part of the faction of the al-‘Ahd al-‘Iraqi group that was in favor of British ties.

Establishment of Iraq and political career
In 1921 the British decided that it would be prudent to set up an Arab government in Iraq and chose Faisal ibn Hussein bin Ali al-Hashemi, the son of Sharif Hussein, to be King. Faisal had never even been to Iraq and so chose certain commanders from the area to fulfill his various posts, including Ja’far Pasha al-Askari who was appointed minister of defense. During this period one of the important things Ja’far al-Askari did was arrange for the return of 600 Ottoman soldiers who were originally from Iraq in order to form the Officer Corps of the new Iraqi army. His brother-in-law Nuri al-Sa’id became Chief of the General Staff of the army in February 1921.
 
In November 1923, King Faisal appointed al-Askari to be prime minister of Iraq. Faisal wanted a strong supporter of the king to be prime minister during this key time when the Constituent Assembly opened in March 1924. The dominant issue during this assembly was the Anglo-Iraqi Treaty the British were pushing to help legitimize their League of Nations-appointed Mandate of Iraq. Many Iraqis were opposed to the treaty and it did not look like it would pass. But then High Commersioner Percy Cox threatened to fulfill the British Mandate in a different way unless it was passed. After the passing of the treaty in the Constituent Assembly, al-Askari resigned as prime minister as he did not really enjoy the job and felt he had accomplished what he needed to.

In November 1926, Faisal again appointed Ja’far al-Askari (who at the time was acting as Iraqi minister in London) prime minister of Iraq. Two main issues dominated his term in office: conscription and Shi’i discontent. Conscription was a controversial issue with one side believing that they needed it to encourage a strong Iraq by creating a strong army and the Sharifians (former Ottoman soldiers who had fought in the Arab revolt) seeing it as a holy duty; those in power also saw it as a way to create national unity and an Iraqi identity. On the other side, Shi’is found it repugnant and the various tribes who wished to be autonomous found it threatening. The British were not in favor of conscription as they thought it could lead to issues in Iraq that they would then have to intervene in and they also wanted to keep the country weaker so as to have better control over the country. Further complicating al-Askari's term was the growing Shi’i discontent in Iraq with massive protests occurring across the country in response to a book written by a Sunni official criticizing the Shi’i majority as well as the promotion of the commanding officer of an army unit that opened fire on Shiite demonstrators during a rally. Also at this time, the British wanted a new Anglo-Iraqi Treaty signed. Among the numerous powers the British retained, the treaty said they would support Iraq's entry into the League of Nations in 1932 (not 1928 as previously promised) as long as it kept itself progressing in a manner consistent with British supervision. Al-Askari resigned as prime minister in December 1927 as a result of the cool reception the draft treaty received among the Iraqi people and the growing discontent in the Shi’i majority.

In addition to his important period as prime minister, Ja’far also served as minister for foreign affairs, diplomatic minister in London multiple times, and minister of defense four other times. He was elected as the president of the Chamber of Deputies in November 1930 and in November 1931.

Assassination and Aftermath
During the 1936 military coup led by Bakr Sidqi against the government of Yasin al-Hashimi, Ja’far, who was serving as minister of defense, was sent to talk to Bakr Sidqi in an attempt to stop the violence and inform Sidqi of the new change in government, that of Hashimi resigning and Hikmat Sulayman (who Sidqi supported) being made prime minister. Sidqi was suspicious of this move and ordered his men to intercept and murder al-Askari. His body was hastily buried along the roadside as Sidqi's supporters triumphantly invaded Baghdad, effectively finalizing Sidqi's power over the government.

Al-Askari's assassination proved to be detrimental to Sidqi. Many of Sidqi's supporters in the army no longer supported the coup as they had been brought in and trained under al-Askari and he was well loved. His death helped to undermine the legitimacy of Sidqi's government. The British, the Iraqis, and many of Sidqi's own supporters were horrified by the act. The new government only lasted 10 months before Sidqi was assassinated through a plot by the officers corps of the Iraqi army. After his assassination, the government he created fell apart and Sulayman stepped down as prime minister. Ja’far al-Asakari's brother-in-law was not content with just seeing Sidqi die and sought revenge against those he found responsible for Ja’far's death. He claimed Sulayman and others were plotting to assassinate King Ghazi. The evidence was speculative and in all likelihood false, yet they were found guilty and sentenced to death (but their terms were commuted to life).

References

1885 births
1936 deaths
Iraqi Arab nationalists
Iraqi nationalists
Ottoman Arab nationalists
Arabs from the Ottoman Empire
Ottoman Army officers
Ottoman Military Academy alumni
Ottoman Military College alumni
Ottoman military personnel of World War I
Ottoman prisoners of war
People from Baghdad
Prime Ministers of Iraq
Presidents of the Chamber of Deputies of Iraq
World War I prisoners of war held by the United Kingdom
Arab independence activists
Assassinated heads of state